Don Stivers (1926 – November 5, 2009) was an American artist, known for his portrayal of historical and military subjects.

Biography
He was born Donald Ray Stivers in 1926 and raised in Superior, Wisconsin. During World War II, he served in the Navy in the Pacific. After his military service, he attended the California College of the Arts in San Francisco.  

He was a member of the Loudoun Sketch Club. His art includes World War II scenes, Civil War scenes, and depictions of the American West. He is most known for his depictions of Buffalo Soldiers. His works are on display at military museums and bases, including the Pentagon, the U.S. Cavalry Museum, and the Army War College.

Stivers' portrait of Civil War hero George Crawford Platt is displayed at the National Gallery of Art in Washington, D.C.

He died on November 5, 2009, at the age of 83.

References

Further reading
"Don Stivers", Booth Western Art Museum, and Seth M. Hopkins. Booth Western Art Museum: Works from the Permanent Collection. Cartersville, GA: Booth Western Art Museum], 2006.  
Stivers, Don. Don Stivers: Limited Edition Prints. Waterford, VA: Stivers Publishing, 1996.  
Stivers, Don, and Lester Rossin. The Art of Painting Children. New York: M. Grumbacher, 1978.

External links
  Official website

California College of the Arts alumni
American war artists
1926 births
2009 deaths
United States Navy personnel of World War II